I Can may refer to:

 "I Can" (Blue song), 2011
 "I Can" (Nas song), 2003
 "I Can", a song by Gotthard from Firebirth, 2012
 "I Can", a song by Brian Harvey, 2007
 "I Can", a song by Helloween from Better Than Raw, 1998
 "I Can", a song by Migos, 2017
 "I Can", a song by Raffi, 2010
 "I Can", a song by Skillet from Skillet, 1996

See also 
 ICAN (disambiguation)
 I Can Fly (disambiguation)